Sri Rama Rajyam is a 2011 Indian Telugu-language Hindu mythological film directed by Bapu who co-wrote the film with Mullapudi Venkata Ramana, and produced by Yalamanchali Saibabu. The film stars Nandamuri Balakrishna, Nayanthara, Akkineni Nageswara Rao, Srikanth, and its music was composed by Ilaiyaraaja. The film was Bapu's final directorial venture. Based on the epic Ramayana, it depicts Rama's rule of Ayodhya after he returns home from Lanka, his separation from Sita and her reclusive life in the forest as she raises their children Lava and Kusa. Sri Rama Rajyam is a reboot of the 1963 blockbuster film Lava Kusa.

Upon its release, Sri Rama Rajyam received positive reviews and became a commercial success. Sri Rama Rajyam garnered seven State Nandi Awards, including the Nandi Award for Best Feature Film; three Filmfare Awards South, and one SIIMA Award. The film was featured at the 42nd International Film Festival of India on 28 November 2011. The film was simultaneously dubbed into Tamil, and Malayalam with the same title, and in Hindi as Ayodhyapati Sri Ram.

Plot
Lord Rama returns to Ayodhya after defeating Ravana along with Goddess Sita to be crowned as the emperor and settles down to a harmonious lifestyle. When his spies inform him that his reputation may be at stake as Sita had spent over a year in Ravana's Lanka, he asks Lakshmana to ensure that Sita is sent to exile. A devastated, pregnant, and distraught Sita is rescued by Valmiki, who takes her to his Ashram by renaming her Lokapavni, where she subsequently gives birth to twin sons Lava and Kusha. Lord Hanuman also accompanies Sita and serves her in the form of tribal child Balaraju. Valmiki trains them in every possible way, including knowledge, warfare, and religion. Ten years later, the twins decide to visit a drought and famine-ravaged Ayodhya to get the blessings of Srirama and Sita as well as recite the Ramayan, and here they find that Srirama has exiled Sita, and they return home disappointed and refuse to recite the Ramayan any more. The twins then stop the Aswamedha horse, not realising that they will soon be thrust into a confrontation with Lakshman, Rama, and the entire army of Ayodhya. After that, they find out that their father is Rama himself.  Sita reunites her two sons Kusha and Lava with their father Rama and returns to her mother Bhudevi. Rama and his brothers renounce the throne and crown Rama's sons, Lava and Kusha, king. Rama returns to Vaikuntha. As he merges into his original form, Vishnu, he is reunited with Sita in her original form, Lakshmi.

Cast

 Akkineni Nageswara Rao as Valmiki
 Nandamuri Balakrishna as Lord Rama
 Nayanthara as Goddess Sita
 Srikanth as Lakshmana
 Roja as Bhudevi
 K. R. Vijaya as Kousalya Devi
 Vindu Dara Singh as Hanuman
 Pavan Sriram as Balaraju (Young Hanuman)
 Gaurav as Lava
 Dhanush Kumar as Kusha
 Murali Mohan as Janaka Maha Raju
 M. Balaiah as Maharshi Vashistha
 Brahmanandam as Chakali Tippadu
 AVS as Narada
 Sameer as Bharata
 Shanoor Sana as Sumitra
 Sudha as Queen Sunayana (Janaka's wife)
 Hema
 Nagineedu
 Raghunatha Reddy

Production

Development
Veteran director Bapu announced that he would remake 1963 film Lava Kusa with Balakrishna who reprises the role of Lord Rama which was enacted by his father N. T. Rama Rao in the original film. Bapu's friend Mullapudi Venkata Ramana has written the screenplay and dialogues for the film and notably was his last film as he died before the film's release. Bapu said that the title of the film was inspired from 1943 Hindi film Ram Rajya.

Balakrishna was assigned to play Rama.Mamta Mohandas was the original choice after considering Jyothika, Anushka Shetty and Sneha.But she couldn't do it owing to her cancer treatment, after which Nayanthara was selected to play Sita. Balakrishna said that when Saibabu approached him for the role the moment he said that Bapu is to direct the film, without any questions, he immediately said ‘yes'. For the character, Balakrishna had to shave off his moustache. Sandhya Janak was selected to play the role of queen Sumithra. Saikumar was initially approached to the enact the character of Bharatha but he was eventually replaced by Sameer. Gaurav, Dhanush and Pawan were selected to play the characters of Lava, Kusa and young Hanuman.

Filming

The filming began on 22 November 2010. The costumes for the film was designed by Anu Vardhan. Anu stated that for Nayanthara, she went and picked up tulasi mala from authentic places. Balakrishna had used his father's accessories and jewellery and Anu replicated it to match with the heroine. Yugandhar Tammareddy of Pixelloid said that Bapu and his team gave storyboards down to the last detail. Along with 100 of his team members, Yugandhar had his task cut out. "The breathtaking palace, the pushpaka vimanam, the Bhoodevi sequence…" were all created by his team. Yugandhar said: "For the palace, we asked the filmmakers to erect a 12-foot palace set just so that there is authenticity when people walk on the floor, lean against a wall or touch a piece of furniture. The rest was done on visual effects". The film was entirely shot at Ramoji Film City with a set erected resembling a kingdom.

Music

The audio of the film was released on 15 August 2011 and the launch was held at Bhadrachalam under Bhadradri Ramayya and Seetamma's Sannidi on the same day.  The soundtrack was composed by Ilaiyaraaja and it features 15 tracks.  The lyrics for the Telugu version were written by Jonnavithhula Ramalingeswara Rao, while Mankombu Gopalakrishnan and Piraisoodan penned the lyrics for the Malayalam and Tamil versions respectively.

Telugu version

Tamil version 
All songs written by Piraisoodan.

Malayalam version

Release

Theatrical 
The film was released on 17 November 2011.  The film was released in Tamil on 27 July 2012. The Malayalam version was released as well. Initially scheduled to be released on 10 November but was postponed.  Producer Sai Babu has said that a good response has come from Malayalam movie lovers and was  planned to release the Hindi version.

Marketing 
The film was promoted with posters attached in tricycles.  P. V. V. Raghavendra Babu, general manager of Prathima Multiplex told "We want to bring back olden days of publicity for the latest mythological movie of Sri Rama Rajyam and get film lovers back to the theatres".

Reception

Box office
The film completed 50 days on 5 January 2012 in 49 centres at the box office.

Critical response 
The film received positive reviews from critics. CNN-IBN which gave a four stars, said "Sri Rama Rajyam is one film that the Telugu film industry can be proud of.  Sri Rama Rajyam is a well-known story, so it's a challenge to remake such a classic, but Bapu's good work turns the remake into another classic. Filmgoers, who look for classics, should not miss this film".

Deccan Chronicle rated three stars explains "Superstar Balakrishna finally stepped into his legendary father NTR's shoes and impressed audiences playing the role of Lord Rama.  Veteran director Bapu deserves all the praise he gets for remaking the classic Lava Kusa (1963) and retaining the soul of the original". NDTV described as "In all, Sri Rama Rajyam is a feel-good film that brilliantly showcases our ancient culture".

Oneindia.in noted "Sri Rama Rajyam is a feel good film that showcases our ancient culture, heritage and values.  The way Bapu managed to make the film into a visual and musical delight is extraordinary and it is a film that can give you an enriching experience while entertaining you in good measure". Rediff gave three stars said "Kudos to Bapu and Saibabu for recreating the Ramayana magic on celluloid. Only Bapu, the veteran director, could have executed this mammoth task so well. Sri Ramarajyam is an optical feast. Go for it". Sify gave verdict as "Good" and says "The movie holds ample strength to live up to the expectations at the box office.  Bapu and his associate Ramana does not deviate much from Lava Kusa, and they took great pains to see that the element of exaggeration is completely checked". The Hindu wrote: "The director Bapu should be applauded for re-inventing the mythological and using a glitzy starcast and getting an understated performance from all of them".

Accolades

Legacy
Director K. Viswanath compared the duo Bapu and Ramana to "technically perfect and smooth Rolls Royce". Novel of the film based on the screenplay was released in 2012. Rediff included the film in their list "Top Five Telugu Films of 2011".

References

External links
 

2011 films
Films based on the Ramayana
Films scored by Ilaiyaraaja
Films directed by Bapu
Films shot at Ramoji Film City
Films set in ancient India
Films shot in Hyderabad, India
Films based on actual events
2010s Telugu-language films
Hindu mythological films
Hindu devotional films
Remakes of Indian films
Indian epic films